Eupithecia ericeti  is a species of moth of the family Geometridae described by Claude Herbulot in 1970. It is found in northern Madagascar.

It looks similar to Eupethicia graphiticata (de Joannis) but is a little bigger. The length of its front wings is 12 mm.

Subspecies
Eupithecia ericeti ericeti
Eupithecia ericeti abacta Herbulot, 1978

References

ericeata
Moths described in 1970
Moths of Madagascar